Hlatikulu is a town located in the Shiselweni district of southern Eswatini.

Geography 
Hlatikulu is situated above the Grand Valley Estate in the valley of the Mkhondvo River, south of the MR9 trunk road, which leads to Nkwene and Manzini.

Culture 
The town is home to the Hlathikhulu Government Hospital, and the Free Evangelical Assembles Hlathikhulu and Christ the King Parish churches. In the north of the settlement is the Mkhondvo High School.

Populated places in Shiselweni Region